Eveline Gottzein (born 30 September 1931, in Leipzig) is a German engineer and honorary professor of aerospace engineering at the University of Stuttgart.

Early life and education 
After graduating from high school (1949), Gottzein trained as an electrical engineer, then later enrolled at the Technical University of Dresden (1952-1957), before finally enrolling at Technical University of Darmstadt (1957-1962).

Career 
During her studies, she also worked at the Bölkow KG company in Ottobrunn, and by 1963 had become head of a department.

In 1983 Gottzein gained her was at the Technical University of Munich to Dr.-Ing. doctorate on "The Magnetic Wheel as an autonomous functional unit of modular support and guidance systems for magnetic tracks".

In 1989 she become a lecturer at the University of Stuttgart in "Regulatory Problems in Space", and become an honorary professor in 1996, a position which she still holds. She is also an honorary professor of the Technical University of Munich.

Gottzein specialised in control technology, especially orbital control of satellites, and control systems for guidance systems for high-speed magnetic tracks. She was a scientific advisor to Airbus in the development of a GPS receiver for commercial space applications. She is listed as an inventor on multiple patents. She currently leads the Control and Simulation Department of the Space Division of Astrium.

Gottzein is the first, and so far only, woman to be awarded the Werner von Siemens Ring, one of the highest awards for technical sciences in Germany.

Awards 
 1993 Werner von Siemens Ring
 1996 Bavarian Order of Merit
 1998 Bavarian Maximilian Order for Science and Art
 2000 Great Cross of Merit
 2007 American Institute of Aeronautics and Astronautics Fellow
 2008 International Federation of Automatic Control Fellow
 2011 Distinguished Affiliated Professor Technical University of Munich

References

Other sources 
 Martin Morlock: Verschiebung. Der Spiegel, 17 January 1966, p89

External links 
Eveline Gottzein at University of Stuttgart
Publications at National Germany Library (in German)

German women engineers
German aerospace engineers
Academic staff of the University of Stuttgart
Werner von Siemens Ring laureates
Technical University of Munich alumni
1931 births
Living people
Engineers  from Leipzig
Fellows of the International Federation of Automatic Control
Commanders Crosses of the Order of Merit of the Federal Republic of Germany